Seoul Arts High School (Hangul: 서울예술고등학교), also known by the Korean-language abbreviation  (Hangul: 예고), is a private arts high school located within Pyeongchang-dong, Jongno District, in Seoul, South Korea.

History
Seoul Arts High School was founded on March 21, 1953 as Ewha Arts High School by the Yooha School Foundation (which was later renamed Ewha School Foundation and is the same foundation that operates Ewha Girls' High School and its other satellite schools). The name was changed later that year to reflect the school's coeducational status. Originally a government-aided school, it was granted autonomous (private) status, effective from the 2003–04 academic year.

The school held a special exhibition in 2013 to celebrate its 50th anniversary.

The incumbent principal, Geum Nan-se (금난새), was appointed in 2014 and is the school's 8th principal.

Academics
Over the years, Seoul Arts High School has gained a reputation as one of the country's premier schools for both its arts programs and results in the university entrance examinations (SAT). The music department has notably sent its students to the country's top music schools, including Seoul National University's College of Music, and the internationally renowned Curtis Institute of Music and Juilliard School in the United States.

The art and dance departments are also well-known for high-achieving graduates as well.

Seoul Arts High School requires students to take mainstream subjects like their peers in regular high schools, in addition to specialist majors offered by the three departments:
Dance
Art
Music

Notable alumni

 Ji Young Chae, ballerina
 Cho Min-kyu, classical crossover singer and member of Forestella
 Seong-Jin Cho, classical pianist
 Myung-wha Chung, cellist
 Goo Jae-yee, actress and model
 Chi-Ho Han, pianist
 Han Soo-jin, ice hockey player
 Hong Jin-ho, cellist and member of Hoppipolla
 Sumi Hwang, soprano
 Jung Ki-yeol, musical actor known by the stage name Kai
 Kim Dae-jin, pianist and professor
 Lee Joon, singer and actor
 Shi-Yeon Sung, conductor
 Seung Hee Yang, violinist
 Soyoung Yoon, violinist

References

External links
  

High schools in Seoul
Jongno District
Educational institutions established in 1953
Christian schools in South Korea
Private schools in South Korea
1953 establishments in South Korea